Roble Shipping Inc. is a Cebu-based shipping line located in Cebu City, Philippines. The company was founded by Jose Roble, a native of Danao, Cebu.

History
Established on February 20, 1985, it started with a small cargo vessel called MV Marao plying from Cebu to Iloilo containing rice and mixed cargo materials. Roble Shipping Inc. is now one of the major players in the Leyte and Samar routes. The shipping line has seven-passenger vessels of which five are roll-on/roll-off vessels, ten cargo vessels and four barges and tugboats.

The founder and owner of Roble Shipping Inc., Jose L. Roble, died on September 11, 2009 at the Cebu Doctors' University Hospital at the age of 62.
All of his sons and daughters now play important roles in steering the company.

The Duranos also helped in the early years in establishing the company.

In 2010, Roble Shipping Inc. will move all its operations to their new headquarters in Pier 7.

Passenger fleet 
Current
Roble Shipping's fleet consists of 5 Roll-On Roll-Off vessels and 1  High-speed craft
MV Theresian Stars (ex-Cagayan Princess)
MV Joyful Stars (ex-Cebu Princess)
MV Ocean Stars
MV Graceful Stars
MV Superjoy (Fastcraft)

Former
MV Heaven Star
MV Ormoc Star
MV Wonderful Stars
MV Sacred Stars
MV Blessed Stars
MV Hilongos Diamond
MV Oroquieta Stars (Destroyed during the onslaught of Typhoon Odette)
MV Beautiful Stars

New
MV Immaculate Stars
MV Claudine Stars

Ports of call 
Roble Shipping Inc. main port of call is Cebu City.

Other ports of call:

 Catbalogan
 Ormoc
 Baybay
 Hilongos
 Naval, Biliran
 Oroquieta

Routes 
Cebu-Ormoc: MV Joyful Stars
Cebu-Hilongos: MV Joyful Stars / MV Theresian Stars  / MV Superjoy Fastcraft / MV Oroquieta StarsCebu-Catbalogan: MV Ocean Stars / MV Beautiful StarsCebu-Naval, Biliran: MV Ocean Stars / MV Beautiful StarsCebu-Oroquieta City: MV Oroquieta StarsCebu-Baybay: MV Graceful Stars / MV Superjoy'' Fastcraft

Incidents 
 M/V Hilongos Diamond sunk within the Bato, Leyte Port
 January 3, 2008 - The MV Heaven Star of the Roble Shipping Lines left Ormoc City about 11 a.m. and was scheduled to arrive in Cebu City port at 3 pm. The vessel stopped off Isabel town in Leyte at noon. The vessel suffered a mechanical problem after seawater got into its bunker fuel. The company's other vessel M/V Wonderful Stars followed up to M/V Heaven Star's location to tow it.
 MV Wonderful Star collided with a foreign-owned cargo vessel MCC Sulo at 1:20 am. The MV Wonderful Star's port side (left side) catwalk railings were slightly damaged while MCC Sulo's starboard (right) bow had a slight scratch.
 Last December 2, 2009 - M/V Wonderful Stars had a collision with a passenger-cargo vessel M/V Subic Bay 1 of Carlos A. Gothong Lines. The said vessel had gone sideways and sustained damages estimated to be within P600,000 to P700,000.

See also 

 List of shipping companies in the Philippines
 2GO Travel
 Montenegro Lines
 Aleson Shipping Lines
 Weesam Express
 Supercat Fast Ferry Corporation
 Trans-Asia Shipping Lines

References

External links 
 http://www.cebuboattrips.com/slow_ferries.htm
 Official Website

Ferry companies of the Philippines
Shipping companies of the Philippines
Companies based in Cebu City